Nytvensky District is an administrative district (raion) of Perm Krai, Russia; one of the thirty-three in the krai. Municipally, it is incorporated as Nytvensky Municipal District. It is located in the southwestern central part of the krai. Its administrative center is the town of Nytva. Population:  The population of Nytva accounts for 43.5% of the district's total population.

Notable residents 

Evgeniy Garanichev (born 1988 in Novoilyinsky), biathlete

See also
Mokino, Nytvensky District, Perm Krai

References

Notes

Sources

Districts of Perm Krai
States and territories established in 1923